"The Best Disco in Town" is a 1976 crossover disco single by Philadelphia-based group, The Ritchie Family. In the United States, the single was a top 20 hit on both the soul and pop charts.  "The Best Disco in Town" went to number one for one week on the disco/dance chart.

Background
The song is a medley of pop and R&B hits, preceding other medleys like Shalamar's "Uptown Festival" by 1 year and Stars On 45's "Medley" by 5 years.

Songs included on the single are "Reach Out I'll Be There", "I Love Music", "Bad Luck", "TSOP", "Fly, Robin, Fly", the group's own "Brazil".  The extended single adds the songs "Love To Love You Baby", "That's the Way (I Like It)", "Lady Bump", "Express", "Lady Marmalade", and the group's own song from the Arabian Nights album, "Romantic Love."

Chart history

Weekly charts

Year-end charts

References

Songs about disco
1976 singles
1976 songs
The Ritchie Family songs
Song recordings produced by Jacques Morali
Songs written by Henri Belolo
Songs written by Jacques Morali
Music medleys